Organic computer may refer to:

 Wetware computer, a computer made from biological materials
 Organic computing, an emerging computing paradigm in which a system and its components and subsystems are well coordinated in a purposeful manner